Teilhet may refer to:

 Teilhet, Ariège, a commune in the Ariège department, France
 Teilhet, Puy-de-Dôme, a commune in the Puy-de-Dôme department, France
 Teilhet (surname)